The Minister of Foreign Affairs of Trinidad and Tobago is a cabinet minister in charge of the Ministry of Foreign Affairs of Trinidad and Tobago, responsible for conducting foreign relations of the country.

The following is a list of foreign ministers of Trinidad and Tobago since its founding in 1961:

References

Foreign
Foreign ministers of Trinidad and Tobago
Politicians